Joshua Angelo Alolino is a Filipino basketball player for the Terrafirma Dyip of the Philippine Basketball Association (PBA). He was selected in the second round of the 2016 PBA draft by the Phoenix Fuel Masters with the 14th overall pick.

PBA career statistics

As of the end of 2022–23 Season

Season-by-season averages
 
|-
| align=left | 
| align=left | Phoenix
| 35 || 14.1 || .397 || .273 || .702 || 1.6 || 1.1 || .6 || .0 || 6.0
|-
| align=left | 
| align=left | Phoenix
| 19 || 13.8 || .402 || .441 || .667 || 1.7 || 1.3 || .7 || .2 || 6.1
|-
| align=left | 
| align=left | Blackwater
| 22 || 9.0 || .261 || .200 || .700 || 1.0 || .9 || .4 || .0 || 2.1
|-
| align=left | 
| align=left | San Miguel
| 7 || 7.0 || .444 || .333 || 1.000 || .3 || .7 || .4 || .0 || 2.7
|-
| align=left | 
| align=left | Terrafirma
| 1 || 15.4 || .000 || .000 || .667 || .0 || 3.0 || .0 || .0 || 2.0
|-
| align=left | 
| align=left | Terrafirma
| 21 || 13.2 || .309 || .256 || .727 || 1.7 || 1.3 || .3 || .0 || 3.7
|-class=sortbottom
| align=center colspan=2 | Career
| 105 || 12.3 || .360 || .292 || .705 || 1.4 || 1.1 || .5 || .0 || 4.5

References

1994 births
Living people
Basketball players from Cavite
Blackwater Bossing players
Filipino men's basketball players
People from Bacoor
Phoenix Super LPG Fuel Masters players
NU Bulldogs basketball players
San Miguel Beermen players
Phoenix Super LPG Fuel Masters draft picks
Terrafirma Dyip players